Corey Crawford (born December 31, 1984) is a Canadian former professional ice hockey goaltender. Nicknamed "Crow" by teammates and fans, he played his entire professional career with the Chicago Blackhawks of the National Hockey League (NHL), who selected him in the second round, 52nd overall, of the 2003 NHL Draft. Crawford made his NHL debut for Chicago in 2006 and played with the team through the 2019–20 NHL season. He won the Stanley Cup and William M. Jennings Trophy twice with the Blackhawks in 2013 and 2015.

Playing career

Junior
Crawford was drafted 52nd overall in the 2003 NHL Entry Draft by the Chicago Blackhawks. He spent his pre-junior career playing for the Midget AAA Gatineau Intrépides, before spending his junior career with the Moncton Wildcats of the Quebec Major Junior Hockey League (QMJHL). Crawford was the goaltender for the Wildcats in the 2003–04 QMJHL playoffs, when they ousted the Rimouski Océanic in the semi-finals to advance to the President's Cup final, but lost that series to the Gatineau Olympiques. Crawford currently holds the Wildcats record for lowest goals against average (GAA) (2.47 in 2004–05), most wins (35 in 2003–04) and is tied with Simon Lajeunesse for most shutouts in a season (six in 2004–05). He was twice named to the QMJHL's Second All-Star team (2003–04, 2004–05).

Professional

Chicago Blackhawks
Crawford made his NHL debut with the Blackhawks on January 22, 2006, against the Minnesota Wild. He relieved Adam Munro in the third period, made seven saves and did not allow any goals. He recorded his first career start against the St. Louis Blues on February 2, 2006. He finished the evening with five goals allowed and 29 saves in a 6–5 shootout loss. He recorded his first career win and shutout against the Anaheim Ducks on March 5, 2008. Crawford also recorded a strong performance against the Detroit Red Wings, stopping 45 of 47 shots in a 3–1 loss on March 11.

The Blackhawks re-signed Crawford to a one-year deal on July 21, 2008. Crawford was recalled from the American Hockey League (AHL) on November 28 to take the place of Nikolai Khabibulin, who had been injured two nights earlier. Crawford made his first Stanley Cup playoffs appearance on May 24, 2009, in the second period of the Western Conference Finals against the Detroit Red Wings, replacing Cristobal Huet. He stopped six of seven shots before being replaced by Huet after the second period.

For the 2009-10 NHL season, Antti Niemi backstopped the Blackhawks to the Stanley Cup. Crawford did not qualify to have his name engraved on the Stanley Cup but did receive a championship ring and took part in the Stanley Cup parade.

Due to the departures of starter Niemi to the San Jose Sharks and Cristobal Huet to the Swiss National League A, Crawford was promoted to back-up goaltender behind Marty Turco for the 2010–11 season. Later in the season, Crawford became the team's starting goaltender, replacing the veteran Turco. He had a two-game shutout streak later in the season and compiled a 176:09 shutout streak from January 7 to 15, the longest by a Blackhawks netminder since Tony Esposito from January 16 to 30, 1972. From February 20 until March 5, 2011, Crawford had an eight-game win streak, setting a new record for the longest such streak for a rookie. The streak was also one game short of the team record set by Glenn Hall.

Crawford earned his 30th win of his rookie season on March 28, 2011, at Detroit, becoming the first Blackhawks goaltender to reach the 30-win milestone since Jocelyn Thibault did it with 33 wins in the 2001–02 season. In his first playoff series against the Presidents' Trophy-winning Vancouver Canucks, he recorded a 36-save shutout in game five of the 2011 Western Conference Quarter-finals, marking the first time he recorded a shutout in the NHL playoffs, and the Blackhawks' largest margin of victory (5–0) in franchise history in a playoff game. The Blackhawks ultimately lost the series to the Canucks in seven games when Alexandre Burrows scored the series-winning overtime goal for Vancouver.

On May 19, 2011, Crawford signed a three-year, $8 million contract extension with the Blackhawks. After the 2010–11 season, he was named to the NHL All-Star Rookie Team.

Following the 2010–11 regular season, Crawford entered the year as the Blackhawks' number one netminder. After starting the year off strong, Crawford struggled for a majority of the season and was often benched in favour of veteran backup Ray Emery, who played extensively down the stretch. However, Emery could not solidify his hold on the starter's role and as a result, Crawford reclaimed the team's starting goaltender position. After going 8–1–2 over his last 11 games, Crawford was confirmed as the starter for the Blackhawks heading into the 2012 Stanley Cup playoffs. In all, Crawford finished his second full season playing in 57 games and posting a 30–17–7 record with a .903 save percentage and 2.72 GAA with no shutouts. He became the first Blackhawks goalie to win at least 30 games in back-to-back seasons since Ed Belfour did it in the 1992–93 and 1993–94 seasons.

Entering the lock-out-shortened 2012–13 season, there were doubts as to whether Crawford could return to his stellar form from his rookie season. The team re-signed Emery to give him a push for the starting job. The Blackhawks started off the season with a point streak of 24 consecutive games (21–0–3), with Crawford getting off to a strong 11–0–3 start before struggling in a loss to the Colorado Avalanche in which he was pulled midway through the game after allowing three goals on 16 shots. He finished the season with a record of 19–5–5, with a 1.94 GAA, and a .926 save percentage with three shutouts. Due to his efforts, he was awarded the William M. Jennings Trophy along with Emery, who finished with a 1.94 GAA as well. Crawford was confirmed as the starter for the 2013 Stanley Cup playoffs and started every game as Chicago eventually won the Stanley Cup, prevailing over the Boston Bruins in six games. 

On September 2, 2013, Crawford signed a six-year, $36 million contract extension with the Blackhawks through the 2019–20 season.

Crawford started the 2014–15 season with a 12–5–1 record. He injured his foot, however, on December 1, 2014, while attending a Rise Against concert. Due to this, Crawford was expected to miss two-to-three weeks. Crawford was selected to play in the 2015 NHL All-Star Game, one of six players selected via fan-vote (the others being his teammates Duncan Keith, Brent Seabrook, Patrick Kane and Jonathan Toews, as well as the Buffalo Sabres' Zemgus Girgensons). On March 23, 2015, Crawford became the fourth goalie in Blackhawks franchise history to have four 30-win seasons. Crawford and Carey Price of the Montreal Canadiens, won the William M. Jennings Trophy for the 2014–15 season. He finished the season with 32–20–5, recording a 2.27 GAA, a .924 SV % and two shut outs. After allowing nine goals in two first round playoff games against the Nashville Predators, Crawford was benched in favour of rookie goaltender Scott Darling, who posted three wins and one loss against the Predators. Crawford relieved Darling in game six of the series after the Predators scored three goals in the first period. Crawford stopped all 13 shots he faced en route to a 4–3 win to take the series. Crawford was named the starter over Darling for the second round against Minnesota. Crawford started all four games in the second round sweep over Minnesota, allowing 7 goals in those 4 games. Crawford also performed well in the following round versus the Anaheim Ducks, leading Chicago to a come-from-behind four games to three series win. On June 15, 2015, Crawford collected his second shutout in a 2–0 victory over the Tampa Bay Lightning in Game 6 of the 2015 Stanley Cup Finals to give the Blackhawks their third Stanley Cup in the last six years. The win was also the second Stanley Cup for Crawford in his career.

During the 2015–16 NHL season, Crawford appeared in 58 games for the Blackhawks. He posted a 2.37 goals-against average (GAA), a .924 save percentage, 35 wins, and seven shutouts. In March 2016, The Blackhawks announced that Crawford would miss indefinite amount of time due to an unspecified upper-body injury. Crawford finished the year with a career high 35 wins and tied his career high save percentage at .924. He also had a career high seven shutouts, which also led the NHL among goalies. He broke Tony Esposito's franchise playoff record for wins, with his 46th playoff win after stopping 29 shots in a 3-2 Game 2 victory over the St. Louis Blues. The Blackhawks would be eliminated from the playoffs by the Blues in seven games.

Crawford underwent emergency appendectomy surgery on December 3, 2016, in Philadelphia on the morning before a road game against the Flyers. He returned to the Blackhawks lineup on December 23, 2016. Crawford was selected to play 2017 NHL All-Star Game. Crawford finished the season a 32–18 record, while recording a 2.55 GAA and a .918 save percentage. The Blackhawks won the Central Division, but were swept by the Nashville Predators in the first round of the playoffs.

Crawford started the 2017–18 NHL season ranking seventh in the NHL with a 2.29 GAA and fourth with a .930 save percentage in 21 appearances. On December 1, 2017, the Blackhawks placed Crawford on IR after he sustained a lower-body injury the previous night. Crawford returned after missing three games, but sustained an undisclosed upper-body injury after playing in seven games. The Blackhawks stated Crawford would be out indefinitely, but were hopeful that he could return before the end of the season. However, the Blackhawks fell into last place in the Central Division, and were eliminated from playoff contention in early March. The Blackhawks left Crawford on IR for the remainder of the season.

Crawford returned to the Blackhawks on October 18, 2018 after missing 52 games. He collected his first win of the 2018–19 Chicago Blackhawks season on October 20, in a 4–1 victory over the Columbus Blue Jackets. Crawford suffered another serious concussion on December 16 after San Jose Sharks forward Evander Kane shoved teammate Dylan Strome into him. The Blackhawks placed Crawford on IR again. Crawford recorded a .902 save percentage and 3.28 GAA up to that point in the season. On February 25, 2019, The Blackhawks activated Crawford from IR after missing 28 games. His strongest performance of the campaign came on March 16, when made a career-high 48 saves en route to a 2–0 win against the Montreal Canadiens. Crawford posted a 7–4–3 record in his next 15 starts and finished the 2018–19 season with a .908 save percentage and 2.77 goals against average. Crawford missed the Blackhawks' season finale after sustaining a groin injury during the team's penultimate game.

Prior to the 2019–20 NHL season, the Blackhawks signed goaltender Robin Lehner to a one-year deal. Lehner and Crawford shared the crease throughout the 2019–20 season until the Blackhawks dealt Lehner to the Vegas Golden Knights at the trade deadline. Crawford started the remaining 10 games of the season, which was shortened due to the COVID-19 pandemic. He finished the regular season with a .917 save percentage, 2.77 GAA, and one shutout. Crawford was late to join the Blackhawks in preparing for the 2020 Stanley Cup playoffs. He later revealed he was recovering from COVID-19 but returned in time for the start of the qualifying round. Crawford and the Blackhawks defeated the Edmonton Oilers in the qualifying round of the playoffs, but lost to the Vegas Golden Knights in the first round. Crawford started all nine games for the Blackhawks, posting a 3.31 GAA and .907 save percentage.

On October 8, Blackhawks general manager Stan Bowman announced the team would not re-sign Crawford, ending his 17-year tenure with Chicago. His 260 career wins are the third-most in Blackhawks franchise history. Crawford's 52 postseason wins are the most by any Blackhawks netminder. He is also the only Blackhawks goalie to win multiple Stanley Cup championships.

Retirement
On October 9, 2020, Crawford signed a two-year, $7.8 million contract with the New Jersey Devils. He missed multiple days of the team's subsequent training camp due to "maintenance" and "personal reasons." On January 8, 2021, the Devils announced Crawford would take an indefinite leave of absence. The following day, Crawford announced his retirement from professional hockey.

Personal life
A native of Châteauguay, Quebec, Crawford speaks both French and English fluently.

He and his wife, Kristy Muscolino, have two sons: Cooper, born in 2017, and Camden Emery, born in 2020.

Crawford is also interested in collecting and restoring vintage cars. His collection includes a 1969 Chevelle and a 1969 Camaro. Crawford previously purchased and restored a 1970 Chevelle, which he donated to the Blackhawks Foundation. The car was auctioned for more than $200,000.

Career statistics

Regular season and playoffs

International

Awards and achievements

References

External links

 
 Corey Crawford biography at hockeygoalies.org – advanced statistics and game logs
 Yahoo! Sports profile

1984 births
Living people
Anglophone Quebec people
Canadian ice hockey goaltenders
Chicago Blackhawks draft picks
Chicago Blackhawks players
Ice hockey people from Quebec
Moncton Wildcats players
National Hockey League All-Stars
Norfolk Admirals players
People from Châteauguay
Rockford IceHogs (AHL) players
Stanley Cup champions
William M. Jennings Trophy winners